The Salinas Grandes ('Salina' is a spanish word for salt flat) is a large salt flat in central-northern Argentina, spanning the borders of four provinces (Córdoba, Catamarca, La Rioja and Santiago del Estero), at an average altitude of  above sea level, and having an area of about 4,700 km2.

References

External links

Salt flats of Argentina
Deserts of Argentina
Geography of Córdoba Province, Argentina
Geography of Santiago del Estero Province
Landforms of Córdoba Province, Argentina
Landforms of Santiago del Estero Province